Richard Sydney Anthony (20 October 1875 – 3 January 1962) was an Irish politician and trade unionist.

Biography
In his teens he joined the printing staff of The Cork Examiner, where in time he became a linotype operator. A member of the Cork Typographical Association (president from the 1920s), he became a leading figure in the Cork Workers' Council. In the 1920s he was a member of the national executive of the Labour Party and in 1924 a member of the executive council of the Irish Trades Union Congress.

Anthony stood unsuccessfully for election at the 1923 general election. He was first elected to Dáil Éireann as a Labour Party Teachta Dála (TD) for the Cork Borough constituency at the June 1927 general election. He was re-elected as a Labour Party TD at the September 1927 general election. 

In 1931, Anthony defied the Labour whip and supported the Constitution (Amendment No. 17) Bill, a measure proposed by the government of W. T. Cosgrave against the Irish Republican Army. The Executive Council sought to establish military courts that were empowered to impose sentences – including capital punishment, without appeal – in response to IRA violence. Alongside Daniel Morrissey, Anthony broke ranks with Labour, who thought the measures too authoritarian, and voted for the bill, and both of them were expelled from the party.

Anthony was elected as an independent TD at the 1932 general election. He was re-elected as an independent TD at the 1933 and 1937 general elections.

Anthony was well known for his anti-communist views. In August 1939 he told the forty-fifth Irish Trade Union Congress that he would prefer fascism to a "dictatorship of the proletariat". Earlier that same year, back in April, Anthony had proposed a motion at Cork City Corporation congratulating General Franco on "concluding his war against communism and anarchy in Spain".   

He lost his seat at the 1938 general election but was re-elected at the 1943 and 1944 general elections as an independent. He re-joined the Labour Party in 1948. He again lost his Dáil seat at the 1948 general election but was elected to the 6th Seanad on the Labour Panel at the subsequent Seanad election in 1948. He stood at the 1951 general election but was not elected. He did not contest the 1951 Seanad election but was elected to the 8th Seanad in 1954, again on the Labour Panel. He did not contest the 1957 Seanad election and retired from politics. 

He served as Lord Mayor of Cork from 1942 to 1943. He married three times; he and his first wife (née Powell from Cork) had seven children.

References

 

1875 births
1962 deaths
Independent TDs
Independent members of Seanad Éireann
Irish anti-communists
Labour Party (Ireland) TDs
Local councillors in Cork (city)
Lord Mayors of Cork
Members of the 11th Dáil
Members of the 12th Dáil
Members of the 5th Dáil
Members of the 6th Dáil
Members of the 6th Seanad
Members of the 7th Dáil
Members of the 8th Dáil
Members of the 8th Seanad
Members of the 9th Dáil
Politicians from County Cork
Typesetters